Yuki Ono may refer to:
 Yūki Ono (小野 友樹, born 1984), Japanese voice actor and singer
 Yūki Ōno (大野 勇樹, born 1985), Japanese wrestler

See also 
 Yuki Onodera
 Yoko Ono
 Yoko Ono (judoka)
 Yūko Ōno
 Yuji Ohno
 Yukari Ohno
 Yuki Onishi
 Yuki (given name)
 Yuki (disambiguation)
 Ono (surname)
 Ono (disambiguation)